Pristiapogon is a genus of cardinalfishes native to the Indian and Pacific Oceans.

Species
The recognized species in this genus are:
 Pristiapogon abrogramma (T. H. Fraser & Lachner, 1985) (lateral-striped cardinalfish)
 Pristiapogon exostigma (D. S. Jordan & Starks, 1906) (narrow-striped cardinalfish)
 Pristiapogon fraenatus (Valenciennes, 1832) (bridled cardinalfish)
 Pristiapogon kallopterus (Bleeker, 1856) (iridescent cardinalfish)
 Pristiapogon menesemus (O. P. Jenkins 1903)
 Pristiapogon taeniopterus (E. T. Bennett, 1836) (bandfin cardinalfish)
 Pristiapogon unitaeniatus (Allen, 1995) (single-striped cardinalfish)

References

Apogoninae
Marine fish genera
Taxa named by Carl Benjamin Klunzinger